In mathematics, the Jacobian variety J(C) of a non-singular algebraic curve C of genus g is the moduli space of degree 0 line bundles. It is the connected component of the identity in the Picard group of C, hence an abelian variety.

Introduction

The Jacobian variety is named after Carl Gustav Jacobi, who proved the complete version of the Abel–Jacobi theorem, making the injectivity statement of Niels Abel into an isomorphism. It is a principally polarized abelian variety, of dimension g, and hence, over the complex numbers, it is a complex torus. If p is a point of C, then the curve C can be mapped to  a subvariety of J with the given point p mapping to the identity of J, and C generates J as a group.

Construction for complex curves

Over the complex numbers, the Jacobian variety can be realized as the quotient space V/L, where V is the dual of the vector space of all global holomorphic differentials on C and L is the lattice of all elements of V of the form

where γ is a closed path in C. In other words,

with  embedded in  via the above map. This can be done explicitly with the use of theta functions.

The Abel–Jacobi theorem states that the torus thus built is a variety, the classical Jacobian of a curve, that indeed parametrizes the degree 0 line bundles, that is, it can be identified with its Picard variety of degree 0 divisors modulo linear equivalence.

Algebraic structure

As a group, the Jacobian variety of a curve is isomorphic to the quotient of the group of divisors of degree zero by the subgroup of principal divisors, i.e., divisors of rational functions. This holds for fields that are not algebraically closed, provided one considers divisors and functions defined over that field.

Further notions
Torelli's theorem states that a complex curve is determined by its Jacobian (with its polarization).

The Schottky problem asks which principally polarized abelian varieties are the Jacobians of curves.

The Picard variety, the Albanese variety, generalized Jacobian, and intermediate Jacobians are generalizations of the Jacobian for higher-dimensional varieties. For varieties of higher dimension the construction of the Jacobian variety as a quotient of the space of holomorphic 1-forms generalizes to give the Albanese variety, but in general this  need not be isomorphic to the Picard variety.

See also 

 Period matrix – period matrices are a useful technique for computing the Jacobian of a curve
 Hodge structure – these are generalizations of Jacobians
Honda–Tate theorem – classifies abelian varieties over finite fields up to isogeny
Intermediate Jacobian

References

Computation techniques 

 Period Matrices of Hyperelliptic Curves
 Abeliants and their application to an elementary construction of Jacobians – techniques for constructing Jacobians

Isogeny classes 

 Infinite families of pairs of curves over Q with isomorphic Jacobians
 Abelian varieties isogenous to a Jacobian
 Abelian varieties isogenous to no Jacobian

Cryptography 

 Curves, Jacobians, and Cryptography

General 

Abelian varieties
Algebraic curves
Geometry of divisors
Moduli theory